A significant wave of immigration from the former Yugoslavia to Switzerland occurred during the 1990s and 2000s. While moderate numbers of Yugoslav citizens had residence in Switzerland during the 1980s, the bulk of immigration took place as a consequence of the Yugoslav Wars and by family reunion of those who had immigrated during this period.

About half a million immigrants from the former Yugoslavia lived in Switzerland as of 2009, corresponding to roughly 6.5% of total Swiss population. About half of this number are Albanians, while the other half is of South Slavic origin.

Taken as a single group, people from former Yugoslavia are the largest immigrant group in Switzerland, followed by the Italians at about 294,000. From the ethnic perspective, Albanians form the second largest immigrant group.

Demographics
Since the Swiss Federal Statistical Office keeps a record of the nationalities of foreign residents, their ethnicity is not recorded. In the case of former Yugoslavia, where ethnic conflict was the reason for the war and the breakup of the country, this had the consequence that there were several, sometimes mutually hostile, ethnic groups living in Switzerland, all registered under the same nationality.

History
In 1920, 1,235 citizens of the Kingdom of Serbs,
Croats and Slovenes had residence in Switzerland. This number dropped to below 700 during World War II. After the end of the war and the formation of Democratic Federal Yugoslavia, the number grew slowly, to 1,169 in 1960.
During the 1960s to 1970s, immigration began to pick up noticeably with the influx of migrant workers, with 24,971 Yugoslav citizens registered in 1970 and 60,916 in 1980. With the collapse of Yugoslavia, immigration increased steeply, with 172,777 Yugoslavs registered in Switzerland by 1990. Immigration accelerated still more during the Yugoslav Wars. In 1995, there were more than 330,000 foreigners from former Yugoslavia residing in Switzerland, partly still registered with Yugoslavian nationality, partly under the nationality of Yugoslavia's successor states.

Registration under the successor states of Yugoslavia began gradually after 1992, but the problem remained unresolved until the year 2000.
In 1998, there were still 198,131 foreign residents registered as "Yugoslavian". This number fell to 5,507 by 2000 and to zero by 2001.

The same problem was repeated on a smaller scale with the breakaway of Montenegro from the state of Serbia and Montenegro, and Kosovo from Serbia in 2006 and 2008, respectively. The statistics for 2011 record an increase by 8,922 in the number of citizens of Kosovo, and at the same time a decrease by 10,386 in the number of citizens of Serbia. This does not reflect any real population movement, but the registrations as citizens of Kosovo by Albanians who were formerly registered as Serbian citizens.

Current demographics
As of 2009, nationals of successor states of Yugoslavia are registered as follows:
Serbia and Montenegro: 187,554 (including also those with newer Serbian, Montenegrin or Kosovan passports)
North Macedonia: 60,293
Bosnia and Herzegovina: 37,397
Croatia:  35,259
Slovenia: 2,501

By 1995, there were 40,000 Macedonian citizens in Switzerland. This number has risen further to 61,000 by 2002. This increase does not necessarily reflect immigration, but rather re-registration of formerly Yugoslav citizens as Macedonian nationals.
An estimated 50,000 emigrants from North Macedonia are Albanians from North Macedonia.

Since Kosovo began to issue passports in 2009, an increasing number of Albanians in Switzerland have since been registered as citizens of Kosovo.

The number of foreign residents from former Yugoslavia naturalized as Swiss citizens in 2009 was at 14,780 (Serbia, Montenegro and Kosovo: 8,879; Bosnia and Herzegovina: 2,408; North Macedonia: 1,831; Croatia: 1,599; Slovenia: 63). This corresponds to one third of the total number of naturalizations during this year.

In 2010, out of a total of 40,403 naturalizations, 13,440 were accounted for by citizens of successor states of Yugoslavia, again corresponding to one third of the total number (Serbia: 6,843, Bosnia and Herzegovina: 1,924; Kosovo 1,609; North Macedonia: 1,585; Croatia: 1,479).

Ethnicities
In terms of ethnicity, these populations consist mostly of Albanians, Bosniaks, Serbs, Croats and Macedonians.
The size of each group is unknown and only amenable to rough estimates.
An indicator of ethnicity can be taken from data on languages spoken in Switzerland. Unfortunately, the latest data on this was collected in the 2000 census. At that time, there were 103,000 native speakers of Serbo-Croatian, 95,000 speakers of Albanian and 61,300 speakers of Macedonian.

Estimates on the actual ethnic composition of former Yugoslav immigrants in Switzerland are mostly left to
ethnic cultural organizations. They cannot be expected to have better than single-digit accuracy, but nevertheless give an overview of the general situation; such estimates amount to roughly 250,000 Albanians, 150,000 Serbs, 80,000 Croats and 10,000 Macedonians.
The number of Slovenians in Switzerland is much smaller, well within the four-digit range.

The Albanians in Switzerland consist mostly of Kosovo Albanians and Albanians from North Macedonia and a smaller number of Albanians from Serbia and Albania.

Cultural organizations
Macedonians in Switzerland are organized through many associations and clubs.
The first such association was formed in 1988, and by 1991 there were five Macedonian clubs, now all part of one single organization called Združenie na Makedonskite Društva (ZMD), which was formed in 1992.
The main purpose of this organisation was to encourage and spread Macedonian ideals, culture, language, and tradition.

Reception
The image of the groups from former Yugoslavia in Swiss society is very poor.
In a survey performed in Zurich in 2011, "Former Yugoslavs" were found to be the least popular immigrant group, followed by Turks, Arabs and Germans.
The Albanians have been singled out for their particularly poor image. As the largest group, they tend to be the most visible, besides the factor of prejudice against Islam, and the perceived link between immigration and crime. In a 2010 statistic, young males of the former Serbia and Montenegro (which to a large extent corresponds to the Kosovo Albanians in Switzerland) were found to have a crime rate of 310% of the young males in Swiss population, while those from Croatia, Bosnia and Herzegovina and Macedonia had crime rates of 230%–240% of the Swiss value. It has been pointed out that the crime rates cannot be the only reason for the group's poor image, as the crime rate of the Sri Lankans in Switzerland was still higher, at 470%, while that group has a much better reputation.

Notable people
Historical
Immigrants from the historical Republic of Yugoslavia prior to its disintegration (1943–1990) and its predecessor states (until 1918 part of Austria-Hungary):
Mileva Marić (1875–1948) was an ethnic Serbian physicist, known as the wife of Albert Einstein, who spent most of her life in Zürich.
Leopold Ružička (1887–1976), Swiss-Croatian chemist and Nobel laureate
Vladimir Prelog (1906–1998) was a chemist and Nobel laureate of Croatian origin, naturalized as Swiss citizen in 1959.

Sports
More recent Swiss celebrities of Former Yugoslav origin are found mostly in sports, especially football.
Examples include:
Bosnian: Slaviša Dugić (Bosnian Serb), Damir Džombić, Mario Gavranović (Bosnian Croat), Izet Hajrović, Selver Hodžić, Eldin Jakupović, Vladimir Petković (Bosnian Croat), Vero Salatić, Haris Seferovic, Mustafa Sejmenović;
Croatian Josip Drmić, Goran Ivelja, Mihael Kovačević, Mijat Marić, Oliver Maric, Ivan Rakitić, Boris Smiljanić, Danijel Subotić, Krešimir Stanić, Petar Pušić;
Kosovo Albanian: Almen Abdi, Amir Abrashi, Valon Behrami, Albert Bunjaku, Berat Djimsiti, Beg Ferati, Shkëlzen Gashi, Burim Kukeli, Ermir Lenjani, Sokol Maliqi, Milaim Rama, Rijat Shala, Xherdan Shaqiri, Shani Tarashaj, Frédéric Veseli, Granit Xhaka, Taulant Xhaka, Florent Hadergjonaj, Arlind Ajeti, Albian Ajeti, Adonis Ajeti;
North Macedonia: Naser Aliji (North Macedonia Albanian), Blerim Džemaili (North Macedonia Albanian), Pajtim Kasami (North Macedonia Albanian), Admir Mehmedi (North Macedonia Albanian), Aleksandar Mitreski, Aleksandar Veljanovski;
Montenegrin: Elsad Zverotić (Montenegrin Bosniaks);
Serbian: Fidan Aliti (Serbian Albanian), Nenad Begović, Nikoslav Bjegović, Florijana Ismaili (Serbian Albanian), Bora Milutinović, Marko Pantelić, Dragan Đukić, Vasilije Janjičić, Goran Karanovic, Zdravko Kuzmanović, Boban Maksimović, Srđan Maksimović, Miloš Malenović, Aleksandar Prijović, Nenad Savić, Philippe Senderos (Spanish-Serbian), Alen Stevanović, Gjelbrim Taipi (Serbian Albanian), Miloš Veljković.

To a lesser extent, the group is represented in other sports, e.g.
Goran Bezina (hockey); Petar Majstorovic, Xhavit Bajrami and Azem Maksutaj (kickboxing); Nuri Seferi (boxing).

Pop culture
Swiss singer Patrick Nuo is of mixed Albanian and Swiss descent. Nuo has created 3 albums (one with Warner Music Group).
Edita Abdieski is a Swiss singer-songwriter of Albanian descent (born in Switzerland in 1984 to a North Macedonia Albanian father and a Montenegrin Albanian mother), known as the winner of the debut series of the German X Factor show.

Politicians and businesspeople
Nenad Stojanović, Serbian-Swiss journalist and member of the Grand Council of Ticino
Behgjet Pacolli (Kosovo Albanian billionaire and former President of Kosovo)
Stanko Subotić, who made money in Serbia-Montenegro during the murky times of disintegration of Yugoslavia, lives in Geneva.
Daniel Adam Beadini, president of the New International Party

Notable felons
Svetislav Danilovic  (born 1956 in Titograd) was for some years known as the most dangerous criminal in Switzerland. He immigrated in the early 1980s, and after serving prison sentences for theft and burglary in 1983 and 1984, he was convicted to another sentence in 1987, but he escaped to Yugoslavia, where he was imprisoned. In 1989, he escaped from Yugoslav prison and came back to Switzerland to kidnap Swiss industrialist Karl Zünd. He was arrested after a failed ransom transaction, but escaped from prison again in August 1993. Danilovic now had the plan to kidnap the richest Swiss businessmen, beginning with Martin Ebner. After three unsuccessful kidnapping attempts, he was arrested once again in December 1993. He reportedly planned to kidnap Christoph Blocher next. Danilovic was released from prison in 2008. He next perpetrated a series of armed robberies on wealthy residences in Lower Austria. He was arrested in Austria in March 2010.
Bashkim Berisha  was noted as a Thai-Boxer and as protagonist in a documentary on juvenile violent crime, and became known as the "parking lot killer" (Parkplatzmörder) after killing a Macedonian Albanian over a dispute about a parking space in 2005. He was convicted to a 14-year prison sentence for voluntary manslaughter in 2009.
Another high-profile case of manslaughter was that of Ded Gecaj who shot his daughter's teacher in 1999 (in whom the girl had confided about sexual abuse by her father), and who killed himself in prison in 2010 after being extradited from Kosovo to Switzerland.

See also
Emigration from Kosovo
Switzerland–Yugoslavia relations

References

External links
http://www.croatia.ch Swiss Croatian internet portal
http://www.crkva.ch  Serbian Orthodox Church in Zurich
http://makedonium.ch Swiss Macedonian website

Bosnia and Herzegovina–Switzerland relations
Croatia–Switzerland relations
Kosovo–Switzerland relations
Montenegro–Switzerland relations
North Macedonia–Switzerland relations
Serbia–Switzerland relations
Slovenia–Switzerland relations